François Cotinaud (born 9 August 1956) is a French saxophonist and clarinetist, composer and soundpainter.

Biography 
François Cotinaud studied music with Alan Silva, Cecil Taylor, George Russell, Kenny Wheeler, and Steve Lacy.
He then created the label Musivi, recorded several albums and led various experiences with Denis Colin (Texture), Bobby Few, Ramón López, Glenn Ferris, Enrico Rava, Pascale Labbé, and Serge Adam.

In 1985, he created a quartet with Ramón López, Heriberto Paredes, Thierry Colson, and later with Gilles Coronado. His solo CD Loco Solo (1998) around Luciano Berio displays his trend for contemporary music and provocation. He performed with percussionist, Pierre Charpy (electro-acoustics device) around Arthur Rimbaud's texts ("Rimbaud and M.A.O.").

After a stint in the Tierra del Fuego group led by Pablo Nemirovsky, he showed in "Yo M'enamori" its Mediterranean sensibility through the prism of a contemporary re-reading, freed of tradition, with pianist Sylvie Cohen.

He stands apart from other jazz musicians of his generation in his formal research between text (poetry) and music (improvised or written) in various formations, such as the duet with cellist Deborah Walker ("Poetica Vivace"), the ensemble Text'up (texts by Raymond Queneau and Arthur Rimbaud), and the ensemble Luxus (Pascale Labbé, vocals/Jérôme Lefebvre, guitar) with Rainer Maria Rilke.

He played with the Spoumj (Soundpainting Orchestra of the Union of Jazz Musicians, directed by François Jeanneau), and founded the group Algèbre with Pierre Durand (guitar) and Daniel Beaussier (winds). 
Involved in Soundpainting, a composition language created by Walter Thompson, he founded the ensemble Klangfarben in 2010 (dance, music and actors), which records and does performances dedicated to Arnold Schoenberg and John Cage at museums and theaters.

He organized and produced the two first Soundpainting Festivals in Paris (2013–2014), with 101 artists, major Soundpainting formations like : Spoumj, Klanfarben, Amalgammes, TSO, the Spang, Walter Thompson Orchestra, Batik, Helsinki Soundpainting Ensemble.

He recorded pieces based on an open form, in the spirit of Earle Brown, melding written contemporary music and Soundpainting, with a Multilateral ensemble (contemporary ensemble) and the composer Benjamin de la Fuente.

Composer 
From the age of eight, Cotinaud would write the melodies and musical phrases he invented in a notebook. In 1975, the pedagogue Alan Silva had his students work with motifs that are to decline in musical modes, and had them write their improvisations. Cotinaud continued this work by writing hundreds of themes for the groups he belongs to, both for pedagogy and for professional purposes.
From 1989, it began to converge around more elaborate constructions, creating precise universes, and already around the poetic work of Raymond Queneau, then Victor Hugo, a research project extending until 2017 with the ensemble Luxus.
In 2007, his compositions for clarinet and cello with Deborah Walker (Dedalus ensemble) turned towards a more contemporary, chiseled writing.
He began a series of studies for clarinet, which only had a name since the architecture and articulation with the Lydian system of George Russell and the melodic virtuosity make it a concert experience.
He received a commission for an a cappella mixed choir by the festival Les Voix des Cairns (Quiberon, France), and founded his own publishing company in 2021, Poetica Vivace editions.

Pedagogy 

Cofounder with A. Silva, then director of an improvisation music school in Paris from 1977 to 1987 (I.A.C.P.), Cotinaud taught musical improvisation not only as an idiomatic jazz language, but also in a much freer environment, and has led collective improvisation courses since 1978. 
He teaches Soundpainting in Paris (Mozart conservatory), with his first official class in Finland, and in many towns in France.
He has contributed to the international think tanks of soundpainters (in Bordeaux, London, Barcelona, Paris, Milano, Valencia, Madrid).

Compositions 

Pieces for clarinet: Oreille-Caresse, Jadis-Plume, Puit-Lumière, Eclat-Noir, Cristal-Feuille, Epi-Tambour, Singe-Lune, Bleu-Orange, Phénix ( Lydian progressive studies volumes 1, 2 and 3) commissioned by Poetica Vivace Publisching, 2019-2020

Pieces for saxophone: Inventaire, Mode à la joie, Boire, Oribe, Obéir (around Sequenza IX by Luciano Berio) 1998

Pieces for pour various duos: La perte, Poetica Vivace, Dialogue, Hypothesis, Temps perdu (cello-clarinet) 2007-2008
Pluie-Chemin (flute-clarinet) 2019 – 2'40"
Ombre-Jardin (piece for clarinet and bass-clarinet) 2020 - 2'25"

Pieces for voice, harp and clarinet/tenor saxophone: J'ai rarement vu, Des goûts et des couleurs, Pauvre Jean, Toujours dans la chaussure?, 2009

Pieces for voice, clarinet/tenor saxophone and electric guitar: Crier le Hasard, Prodige, Éternité, Verwandlung, La Bête, spiegele Malerei (around the sonnets to Orpheus of Rainer Maria Rilke), commissioned by label Musivi, 2015 – 30'

Small jazz ensembles: Le Crotoy (1983), Casa del sol, Acrobaties, Dix-huit carats, Princesse, Temakatamawo, (1989), Métakynesis (1990), Ficus, Voix interdites, Pyramides, Circus (1992), Jeux de mains (1994)
Algorithme, Topologie d'un manège, Diagramme, Hologram, Le pendule du Fou, Monoïd, I Would like to be Free, Mes filles commissioned by label Musivi, 2013 – 58'39", Strange Big Sockets for Accordeon, Contralto clarinet and percussions, commissioned by Cie Les Musiques à Ouïr, 2022 - 7'50Big jazz ensemble: Chasse-mouche (1983), Ilperel, Indigo, Tishri (1998), Terre libre commissioned by Orchestre de Jazz Départemental - Seine Saint-Denis 2004No it is open on one position commissioned by Orchestre de Jazz Départemental - Seine Saint-Denis 2005
World premiere Mue du Monde for 72 children choir and jazz ensemble, on the composer's poetry, commissioned by DRAC Champagne-Ardenne 2006Et le diable a tremblé..., Listes en vrac commissioned by département de la Seine Saint-Denis, 2014Like et Vous m'avez dit, sur un poème d'Emile Verhaeren commissioned by département de la Seine Saint-Denis, 2018

Jazz ensembles and improvised music, with poetry: Le festin des ogres, Jambe de Dieu, Danse avec les fous (pieces around Victor Hugo) 1995, Traversée de la page, Suppositions, Le calligraphe du vide (words by Franz Bartelt), la Sieste, Les Généreuses (words by Dominique Pagnier and François Rabelais), Épouvantails (words by André Velter) 1999Déchiffrage, Modestie, Art Popo, Marine, Silence Coi, Rush, (words by Raymond Queneau), Text'up, Ydol Nabdous (words by the composer) commissioned by label Musivi 2002Enfance, Parade, Voyelles, Being Beauteous, À la Musique, Rêvé pour l'hiver, The Bridges, Barbare, Démocratie (words by Arthur Rimbaud), commissioned by label Musivi 2005Je vis, je meurs, written on the famous poetry of Louise Labé 2018

Traditional arrangements or pieces: Mis amigos me dan esperanza, Judish-Spanish traditional arrangements 2000, Deki, El rey que tanto madruga 2004

Pieces for ensemble: Variations sur une collection de timbres 2010 Monologue de Schönberg, Palette Cage (Klangfarben ensemble) commissioned by label Musivi, 2012 Fleeting Patterns (2013)Onomatopée, Tadouda-ta, AcrabilA (Klangfarben ensemble) commissioned by ville de Chelles, 2016Découper-colorier-coller, Cités abacules, Dons des pierres qui parlent, La fin de Pompei, L'usage des couleurs, Du nu dans les bleus, Clé de voûte, Aire de jeux acoustiques (ensemble Multilatérale) with Benjamin de la Fuente, commissioned by label Musivi ; 2017 – 51'Ocre-vent (violin/clarinet/tuba/piano) 2'10, Vague-Lune (violin/clarinet/tuba/ piano) 2020 – 4'43Pieces for a cappella choir: World premiere Orpheus : Un temple dans l'écoute, Elle était une enfant, Le pavot des morts, triptych for a capella mixed choir, commissioned by the DRAC Bretagne 2021 – 13'

Pieces for choir and piano: Exotica on the  Charles Baudelaire's poetry : Parfum exotique  2'47"Sommeil paradoxal on the  Arthur Rimbaud's poetry : Le Dormeur du Val, 2021 – 4'24"

Pieces for choir, soprano voice, symphonic orchestra: Tempus fugit, utere words by Isabelle Normand, commissioned by festival Les Musicales de Quiberon and Sacem, 2022 - 14'22

 Discography 
 As leader or co-leader 
 Portrait for a small woman, Celestrial Communication Orchestra, direction Alan Silva 1978
 Texture sextet 1981, with Itaru Oki, Bruno Girard, Denis Colin, Pierre Jacquet, Michel Coffi
 Desert Mirage, Celestrial Communication Orchestra, direction Alan Silva 1982
 Polygames, with Itaru Oki, Bruno Girard, Denis Colin, Pierre Jacquet, Michel Coffi 1983
 Princesse, featuring Heriberto Paredes, Thierry Colson, Ramón López, Label Musivi 1990
 Pyramides, featuring Heriberto Paredes, Thierry Colson, Ramón López, Glenn Ferris and Enrico Rava, Label Musivi 1992
 Opéra, 17 contemporary improvisations, with Ramón López, Label Musivi 1993
 Loco Solo, improvisations around Sequenza IX from Luciano Berio, Label Musivi 1998
 Yo M'enamori, 14 Jewish-Spanish songs, with pianist Sylvie Cohen, Label Musivi 2000
 François Cotinaud fait son Raymond Queneau, with Text'up ensemble, Label Musivi 2003
 Rimbaud et son double, (collectiv works, box of 2 CD + 1 DVD), with Pascale Labbé, Pierre Charpy, Mathilde Morières, Sylvain Lemêtre, François Choiselat, Jérôme Lefebvre, Olivier Guichard, Label Musivi 2006
 François Cotinaud, Klangfarben ensemble, Monologue de Schönberg and Variations sur une collection de timbres, box CD-DVD, Label Ayler Records/Musivi Soundpainting Collection, 2012
 No Meat Inside, with Henri Roger, Barre Phillips, Emmanuelle Somer, Label Facing You / IMR 2013
 François Cotinaud, Topologie d'un Manège, with Algèbre (Daniel Beaussier, Pierre Durand, Bruno Chevillon, Denis Charolles, François Merville), Label Musivi 2013 (Musea)
 Ensemble LUXUS (Pascale Labbé, François Cotinaud, Jérôme Lefebvre) L'Orphée de Rilke, Label Musivi 2016 (Musea)
 Mosaïques François Cotinaud and Benjamin de la Fuente, ensemble Multilatérale, Label Musivi, Soundpainting Collection, 2018
 Night Access François Cotinaud and Sergio Castrillon (cello), 17 pieces, 2018

 As sideman 
 Le Cercle de Pierres, with Bekummernis (Luc Le Masne, direction and compositions), Ménélas, 1986
 Calcuttango, with Tierra del Fuego (Pablo Nemirovsky, direction and compositions), Tangram, 1994
 Hommage à George Russell'' with Philippe Seignez, Label Musivi, 2018

References 

Sources :

Living people
1956 births
People from Casablanca
French Buddhists
French jazz clarinetists
French jazz saxophonists
Male saxophonists
Members of Sōka Gakkai
21st-century saxophonists
21st-century clarinetists
21st-century French male musicians
French male jazz musicians